Jay Tewake (born 25 February 1990 Papatoetoe, Auckland, New Zealand) is a New Zealand actor. He is best known for his work on the short film GURL and the reality TV mini series Queens of Panguru.

Music
Tewake has also done notable work in Music with producing acts including Mika Haka, JGeek and the Geeks, Bare Feet Street and many more. In 2011, Jay Tewake performed at the 2011 Rugby World Cup Music Event Mika's Aroha Mardi Gras. It was televised on Māori Television. He performed He Hoi alongside his back up dancers GlamBoyz & Ka 400.

Health
Tewake was featured on Māori Television multiple times in a TV series called KA TV and KA Life. The shows were family shows promoting Health, fitness, well-being with dance, healthy eating and exercise. The TV series went on to become a free school holiday program to teach kids to dance. They also did a couple of publicity stunts with flash mobs. They got to join the 2011 Rugby World Cup Music Event Mika's Aroha Mardi Gras and the 2011 Kiwi Day Out.

The Queens of Panguru
In 2017, Jay Tewake starred in the reality TV Series The Queens of Panguru alongside Ramon Te Wake and Maihi Makiha. The five episode short series is about three well known people from the LGBT community who live in the big city of Auckland, return home to their roots. The TV series was televised on Māori Television.

GURL
In 2020, Tewake starred the lead role in the short film GURL. The film was a prequel of the biopic "The Book of Carmen" which is currently in pre-production. The film is based on the life of Carmen Rupe. Tewake also sang on the film's soundtrack. Winner for Best Actor in Medium Length Film at Brazil International Film Festival.

Personal life
On the show Queens of Panguru, Tewake describes himself as a "young gay glamboy". He is the descendant of Heremia Te Wake who was a notable tribe leader, who is the father of respected kuia (Māori elder), Dame Whina Cooper.

Discography

Single

Albums

Filmography

Films

Documentary

Television

Music Video

Accolades

References

External links 
 
 Official Spotify
 Twitch

Gay musicians
New Zealand LGBT musicians
21st-century New Zealand male singers
People from Auckland
Queer men
1990 births
Living people
20th-century New Zealand LGBT people
21st-century New Zealand LGBT people
New Zealand Māori male singers